Munck may refer to:

Adolf Fredrik Munck (1749–1831), Swedish and Finnish noble during the Gustavian era
Bror Munck (born 1857) (1857–1935), officer of the Swedish Army, became lieutenant-general
Charlotte Munck (born 1969), Danish actress, starred in the Danish police television drama Anna Pihl as the title character
Ebba Munck af Fulkila (1858–1946), Swedish noble, lady in waiting and a titular princess, the spouse of Prince Oscar Bernadotte
Frans de Munck (1922–2010), Dutch footballer and football manager
Gerardo L. Munck, Argentine by birth, professor of international relations in the University of Southern California
Gerda Munck (1901–1986), Danish fencer
Jens Munck (1579–1628), Dano-Norwegian navigator and explorer born in Norway
Johan Munck (born 1943), Swedish lawyer and former president of the Supreme Court of Sweden
Joseph de Munck, Belgian Catholic Priest of the Redemptorist Order
Kaj Munck (1898–1944), Danish playwright and Lutheran pastor, martyred during the Occupation of Denmark of World War II
Noah Munck (born 1996), American actor and trap/electronica producer
Oskar A. Munck (born 1928), Norwegian businessperson
Ronaldo Munck, Argentine professor of sociology at Dublin City University (DCU)
Svend Munck (1899–1974), Danish fencer
Sverre Munck (1898–1970), Norwegian businessperson

See also
Munck Cranes (Sverre Munck A/S) was founded on 25 October 1924 by Mr. Sverre Munck
Muck (disambiguation)
Munchkin
Munk